The  is a professional wrestling championship contested in Michinoku Pro Wrestling, where it is the primary singles title, and is strictly for junior heavyweights. It was created on August 25, 2002, when Dick Togo defeated Tiger Mask in a round-robin tournament final.

Title history
A round-robin tournament took place to crown the inaugural tournament and the tournament took place between July 20 and August 25, 2002. The final took place at the 10th Anniversary Show of the promotion on July 25, where Dick Togo defeated Tiger Mask in the tournament final.

Reigns

List of combined reigns

See also
Michinoku Pro Wrestling
Tohoku Tag Team Championship

References

Junior heavyweight wrestling championships
Michinoku Pro Wrestling championships